Richard More (died 1595) was an English politician.

More was an MP for Grantham in 1589 and Plympton Erle in 1586.

References

Year of birth missing
1595 deaths
Members of the Parliament of England for Plympton Erle
English MPs 1586–1587
English MPs 1589